Akahori (written: 赤堀, lit. "red moat") may refer to:

People
 Japanese retired professional baseball player
, Japanese scriptwriter, novelist and manga author

Other uses
Akahori Gedou Hour Rabuge, a Japanese television series
Akahori Station, a railway station in Japan

Japanese-language surnames